The Catholic Church in China (called Tiānzhǔ Jiào, 天主敎, literally "Religion of the Lord of Heaven" after the Chinese term for the Christian God) has a long and complicated history. John of Montecorvino was the first Roman Catholic missionary to reach China proper and first bishop of Khanbaliq during the Yuan dynasty (1271–1368).

After the 1949 takeover by the Chinese Communist Party (CCP), Catholic and Protestant missionaries were expelled from the country and Christianity was generally characterized as a manifestation of western colonial imperialism. 

In 1957, the Chinese government established the Catholic Patriotic Association in Beijing, China, which rejects the authority of the Holy See and appoints its own preferential bishops. Since September 2018, however, the Pope has the power to veto any bishop which the Chinese government recommends.

Chinese terms 

Terms used to refer to God in Chinese differ even among Christians.

Arriving in China during the Tang dynasty, the earliest Christian missionaries from the Church of the East referred to their religion as Jǐngjiào (景教, literally, "bright teaching"). Originally, some Catholic missionaries and scholars advanced the use of Shàngdì (上帝, literally, "The Emperor from Above"), as being more native to the Chinese language, but ultimately the Catholic hierarchy decided that the more Confucian term, Tiānzhǔ (天主, literally, "Lord of Heaven"), was to be used, at least in official worship and texts. Within the Catholic Church, the term '' (公教, literally "universal teaching") is not uncommon, this being also the original meaning of the word "catholic". When Protestants finally arrived in China in the 19th century, they favored Shangdi over Tianzhu. Many Protestants also use Yēhéhuá (耶和华, a transliteration of Jehovah）or Shén (神), which generically means "god" or "spirit", although Catholic priests are called shénfù (神父, literally "spiritual father"). Meanwhile, the Mandarin Chinese translation of "Christ", used by all Christians, is Jīdū (基督).

Catholics and Protestants 
The modern Chinese language generally divides Christians into two groups: adherents of Catholicism, Tiānzhǔjiào (天主教), and adherents of Protestantism, Jīdūjiào (基督教) or Jīdū Xīnjiào (基督新教—"New Religion"). Chinese speakers see Catholicism and Protestantism as distinct religions. Thus, in Western languages, the term "Christianity" can subsume both Protestants and Catholics (i.e., Christians as opposed to, for example, Hindus or Jews). In Chinese, however, there is not a commonly used term that can subsume the two (but today in Chinese Catholic literature, the term "Jīdū zōngjiào" (基督宗教) is used to signify all Christian sects, as the term in Chinese means "religion of Christ"). Eastern Orthodoxy is called Dōngzhèngjiào (東正教), which is simply a literal translation of "Eastern Orthodox Religion" into Chinese.

Tang dynasty (618–690, 705–907) 
The Catholic Church first entered China during the cosmopolitan Tang dynasty era, although it had few native Chinese followers until the 16th century in the Ming dynasty.

Yuan dynasty (1271–1368) 

The Nestorian Christian and Turkic Chinese monk Rabban Bar Sauma (c. 1220–1294) travelled from China to Europe to meet Pope Nicholas IV.

Missionary priests of the Latin Catholic Church in Europe are recorded to have entered China in the 13th century, with the earliest being Franciscans. The Italian Franciscan priest John of Montecorvino arrived in Khanbaliq (modern-day Beijing) in 1294. In 1299 he built a church and in 1305 a second opposite the imperial palace. Having made a study of the local language, he began to translate the New Testament and the Psalms. Estimates of converts range from 6,000 to 30,000 by the year 1300. In 1307 Pope Clement V sent seven Franciscan bishops to consecrate John of Montecorvino as Archbishop of Peking. The three who survived the journey did so in 1308 and succeeded each other as bishops at Zaiton, where John had established. In 1312 three more Franciscan bishops arrived from Rome to aid John until his death in 1328. He converted Armenians in China and Alans in Beijing to Catholicism. Armenians in Quanzhou were also Franciscan Catholics. The Franciscan Odoric of Pordenone visited China during this era. Katarina Vilioni's Catholic tombstone was found in Yangzhou.

The mission had some success during the rule of the Mongol-led Yuan dynasty, but various factors led to an ultimate shrinking of the mission. Six centuries later, however, John of Montecorvino's attempt at the translation of the Bible became the inspiration for another Franciscan, the Blessed Gabriele Allegra, to go to China and in 1968 complete the first translation of the Catholic Bible into the Chinese language, after a 40-year personal effort.

Hayton of Corycus wrote about China.

It was reported that competition with the Catholic Church and Islam were also factors in causing Nestorian Christianity to disappear in China – see Nestorianism in China – since "controversies with the emissaries of .... Rome, and the progress of Mohammedanism, sapped the foundations of their ancient churches." The Catholics considered Nestorianism as heretical.

Armenian King Hethum I, Giovanni da Pian del Carpine, and William Rubruck visited Mongolia.

Ming dynasty (1368–1644) 

During the Catholic Reformation's explosion of missionary efforts around the world, particularly in Asia, Jesuit and other Catholic missionaries attempted to enter China. They had mixed success at first, but eventually came to have a strong impact, particularly in inter-cultural scientific and artistic exchanges among the upper classes of China and the imperial court.

The permanent mission was established in 1601 by the efforts of the Jesuit Matteo Ricci. His whole approach was quite subtle, interesting the Wanli Emperor and the Ming Chinese authorities in aspects of western technology and learning as a point of opening. He also made attempts to reconcile Christianity with the Classic Confucian texts, though he was hostile, along with the other members of the Society of Jesus, to Taoism and Buddhism.

Ricci died in 1610 but the Jesuit mission went on to become an important part of the Imperial civil service right into the 18th century. In 1644 a German Jesuit, Adam Schall von Bell, was appointed Director of the Board of Astronomy by the new Qing dynasty. Jesuits were also given posts as mechanics, musicians, painters, instrument makers, and in other areas that required technical expertise. Likewise, the development of Catholic Christianity in China originated an interesting process of cultural and artistic hybridization during early globalization and up to the present. An example of this is the Christian works of art made in the cloisonné technique.

Qing dynasty (1644–1911) 
In the Qing dynasty, the Jesuits' pragmatic accommodation with Confucianism was later to lead to conflict with the Dominican friars, who came to Beijing from the Philippines in the middle of the century. Dominican leader Domingo Fernández Navarrete in responding to the question "Was Confucius saved?" said that since Greek philosophers such as Socrates, Plato, Aristotle, Seneca, and others were all damned "how much the more Confucius, who was not worthy to kiss their feet"? In responding, António de Gouveia, a Portuguese Jesuit, said that Confucius was certainly saved, "which is more than can be said for King Philip IV of Spain."

While up to this point there had been debate among Western clergy as to whether to ordain Chinese men as priests, the debate was settled in 1654 when Gregorio Lopez (Luo Wenzao) was ordained a priest for the Dominican Order.

Due to the Chinese rites controversy, the Kangxi Emperor banned Christianity in China after 1715, saying "Westerners are trivial; how could they understand Chinese great philosophy? in addition, no Westerners know the Chinese classics. Their discussions (of Chinese philosophy) are ridiculous. In my view, the missionaries' talk is the same as those heretic Buddhist monks, Taoists, and other superstitions. The (knowledge of) Westerners is no more than this (the missionaries' talk). We could simply forbid them from spreading their religion in China, for the sake of avoiding troubles." ("只說得西洋人等小人，如何言得中國人之大理？況西洋人等，無一人通漢書者，說言議論，令人可笑者多。今見來臣告示，竟與和尚道士異端小教相同。彼此亂言者，莫過如此。以後不必西洋人在中國行教，禁止可也，免得多事。")

Under the "fundamental laws" of China, one section is titled "Wizards, Witches, and all Superstitions, prohibited." The Jiaqing Emperor in 1814 added a sixth clause in this section with reference to Christianity. It was modified in 1821 and printed in 1826 by the Daoguang Emperor. It sentenced Europeans to death for spreading Catholic Christianity among Han Chinese and Manchus (Manchurian people, originally from North China). Christians who would not repent their conversion were sent to Muslim cities in Xinjiang, to be given as slaves to Muslim leaders and Baigs. Manchu Christians would also be removed from their Banner registers after being given as slaves to the Baigs.

Some hoped that the Chinese government would discriminate between Protestantism and Catholicism, since the law was directed at Catholicism, but after Protestant missionaries in 1835–6 gave Christian books to Chinese, the Daoguang Emperor demanded to know who were the "traitorous natives in Canton who had supplied them with books." The foreign missionaries were strangled or expelled by the Chinese.

During the Boxer Rebellion (1899–1901), Catholic missionaries and their families were murdered by Boxer rebels.

The Qing dynasty imperial government permitted French Catholic Christian missionaries to enter and proselytize in Tibetan lands, which weakened the control of the Tibetan Buddhist Lamas, who refused to give allegiance to the Chinese. The Tibetan Lamas were alarmed and jealous of Catholic missionaries converting natives to Catholicism. During the 1905 Tibetan Rebellion the Tibetan Buddhist Gelug Yellow Hat sect led a Tibetan revolt. The Lamas massacred Christian missionaries and native converts to Christianity and besieged Bat'ang, burning down the mission chapel and killing two foreign missionaries, Père Mussot and Père Soulié. The Chinese Amban's Yamen was surrounded and Chinese General Wu Yi-chung was shot dead in the Yamen by Lama forces. The Chinese Amban Feng and Commandant in Chief Li Chia-jui managed to escape by scattering rupees behind them, which the Tibetans proceeded to pick up. The Ambans reached Commandant Lo's place, but the 100 Tibetan troops serving under the Amban, armed with modern weaponry, mutinied when news of the revolt reached them. The Tibetan Lamas and their Tibetan followers besieged the Chinese Commandant Lo's palace along with local Christian converts. In the palace they killed all Christian converts, both Chinese and Tibetan.

Republic of China 

After the Rites controversy of the late 17th century and early 18th century ended in the expulsion of missionaries from most of China, access to the people of China was difficult for the Catholic Church. The controversy revolved around the reluctance of the Church to recognize local Confucian customs of honouring deceased family members. To the Chinese, this was an ancient ritual; to the Vatican it was a religious exercise which conflicted with Catholic dogma.

In the 19th century, the French government had taken control of Catholics in China, and the Catholic Church almost exclusively appointed French priests as the ordinaries of China. The French also effectively blocked efforts of Pope Leo XII to establish direct relations with the government. After the Revolution of 1911, which led to the founding of the Republic of China, reform-minded priests such as Vincent Lebbe and prominent Catholic laymen such as Ma Xiangbo and Ying Lianzhi protested to Pope Benedict XV that the French who made up 70% of clergy and controlled the Chinese Church were chauvinist and disdainful of China. Chinese priests were discriminated against and many left the clergy, as Ma Xiangbo himself had done. Benedict directed the establishment of the Catholic University of Peking, which opened in 1925.

Within months of his election, Pope Pius XII issued a further change in policies. On 8 December 1939, the Sacred Congregation for the Propagation of the Faith issued—at the request of Pope Pius—a new instruction, by which Chinese customs were no longer considered superstitious, but instead an honourable way of esteeming one's relatives and therefore permitted by the Catholic Church. The government of the Republic of China established diplomatic relations with the Vatican in 1943. As the Church began to flourish, Pope Pius established a local ecclesiastical hierarchy and elevated the Archbishop of Peking, Thomas Tien Ken-sin, SVD, to the Sacred College of Cardinals. After World War II, about four million Chinese were members of the Catholic Church. This was less than one percent of the population but numbers increased dramatically. In 1949, there existed:
 20 archdioceses
 85 dioceses
 39 apostolic prefectures
 3,080 missionaries
 2,557 Chinese priests.

People's Republic of China 

The Chinese Communist Party (CCP) began targeting Christian missionaries and monasteries during the Chinese Civil War. Even as Protestants began fleeing the country, the Catholic Church ordered over 3,000 of its missionaries in China to remain even as the Communists won the war. After the proclamation of the People's Republic of China (PRC) in 1949 by the CCP, the Catholic Church was initially allowed to operate independently but faced growing legal obstruction and scrutiny. All foreign missionaries were required to register with the government, and Chinese authorities interrogated Catholics and investigated hospitals and schools. It also forced many churches to close by issuing prohibitively high taxes. The Chinese government began mass arrests of foreign missionaries after intervening in the Korean War, but Catholics were ordered by the apostolic nuncio Antonio Riberi to remain and resist. Riberi and Bishop Tarcisio Martina were themselves arrested and expelled for false allegations that they were involved in a conspiracy to assassinate Mao Zedong. Mao also ordered the arrest and execution of all members of the Legion of Mary, which he believed was a paramilitary unit. By the summer of 1953 the Catholic Church had been completely suppressed. 

Since then Catholicism, like all religions, was permitted to operate only under the supervision of the State Administration for Religious Affairs. All legal worship was to be conducted through state-approved churches belonging to the Catholic Patriotic Association (CPA), which did not accept the primacy of the Roman Pontiff. In addition to overseeing the practice of the Catholic faith, the CPA espoused politically oriented objectives as well. Liu Bainian, chairman of the CPA and the Bishops Conference of the Catholic Church in China (BCCCC), stated in a 2011 interview that the church needed individuals who "love the country and love religion: politically, they should respect the Constitution, respect the law, and fervently love the socialist motherland."

Clergy who resisted this development were subject to oppression, including long imprisonments as in the case of Cardinal Kung, and torture and martyrdom as in the case of Fr. Beda Chang, S.J. Catholic clergy experienced increased supervision. Bishops and priests were forced to engage in degrading menial jobs to earn their living. Foreign missionaries were accused of being foreign agents, ready to turn the country over to imperialist forces. The Holy See reacted with several encyclicals and apostolic letters, including Cupimus Imprimis, Ad Apostolorum principis, and Ad Sinarum gentem.

Some Catholics who recognized the authority of the Holy See chose to worship clandestinely due to the risk of harassment from authorities. Several underground Catholic bishops were reported as disappeared or imprisoned, and harassment of unregistered bishops and priests was common. There were reports of Catholic bishops and priests being forced by authorities to attend the ordination ceremonies for bishops who had not gained Vatican approval. Chinese authorities also had reportedly pressured Catholics to break communion with the Vatican by requiring them to renounce an essential belief in Catholicism, the primacy of the Roman Pontiff. In other instances, however, authorities permitted Vatican-loyal churches to carry out operations under strict surveillance.

While Article 36 of China's Constitution provides for "freedom of religious belief" and non-discrimination on religious bases, it also states that "[n]o one shall use religion to engage in activities that disrupt public order, impair the health of citizens or interfere with the state's education system" and "[r]eligious groups and religious affairs shall not be subject to control by foreign forces."

A major impediment to the re-establishment of relations between the Vatican and Beijing was the issue of who appoints the bishops. As a matter of maintaining autonomy and rejecting foreign intervention, the official church had no official contact with the Vatican and did not recognize its authority. In later years, however, the CPA allowed for unofficial Vatican approval of ordinations. Although the CPA continued to carry out some ordinations opposed by the Holy See, the majority of CPA bishops became recognized by both authorities.

In a further sign of rapprochement between the Vatican and Beijing, Pope Benedict XVI invited four Chinese bishops, including two government recognized bishops, one underground bishop, and one underground bishop recently emerged into the registered church, to the October 2005 Synod on the Eucharist.

On 27 May 2007, Pope Benedict XVI wrote a letter to Chinese Catholics "to offer some guidelines concerning the life of the Church and the task of evangelization in China". In this letter (section 9), Pope Benedict acknowledges tensions:

Underground bishop Joseph Wei Jingyi of Qiqihar released a two-page pastoral letter in July 2007, asking his congregation to study and act on the letter of Pope Benedict XVI and naming the letter a "new milestone in the development of the Chinese Church." In September 2007, a coadjutor bishop for the Guiyang Diocese was jointly appointed by the Vatican and the Chinese official Catholic church.

Demographics 

The number of Catholics is hard to estimate because of the large number of Christians who do not affiliate with either of the two
state-approved denominations.

The 2010 Blue Book of Religions, produced by the Institute of World Religions at the Chinese Academy of Social Sciences, a research institution directly under the State Council, estimates Catholics in China to number about 5.7 million. This Chinese government estimate only includes members of the Catholic Patriotic Association (CPA). It does not include un-baptized persons attending Christian groups, non-adult children of Christian believers or other persons under age 18, and unregistered Christian groups.

The Holy Spirit Study Centre in Hong Kong, which monitors the number of Chinese Catholic members, estimated in 2012 that there were 12 million Catholics in both branches of the Catholic Church.

The Pew Research Center estimates in 2011 there are nine million Catholics on the mainland, 5.7 million of whom are affiliated with the CPA.

Hebei Province has the largest Catholic Christian population in China, with 1 million Church members according to the local government. Generally, Catholic institutions are dominant in North and Central regions of China.

Hong Kong and Macau 

The Catholic Church is allowed to operate freely in Macau and Hong Kong. In fact, Donald Tsang, the former Chief Executive of Hong Kong, is a Catholic. Pope John Paul II was, however, denied a visit (which was deemed "inappropriate") to Hong Kong in 1999, by then Chief Executive, Tung Chee Hwa, who was in office from 1997 to 2005, a decision many believe was made under pressure from the central PRC government. The two territories are organized into the Diocese of Hong Kong and the Diocese of Macau.

Diplomatic relations with the Vatican 

The issue of Sino-Vatican relations has been a highly contentious one and often difficult for both sides (see below). The Catholic Patriotic Association (CPA) is a division of China's Religious Affairs Bureau, and has oversight over China's Catholics. According to at least one source, however, China's Catholics, including its clergy and religious sisters, are no longer required to be members of the CPA.

By 2007, the Vatican had indicated on multiple occasions that it desired to establish full diplomatic relations with China, and would be willing to move its embassy from Taiwan to mainland China if necessary. A major obstacle between the two sides remained the Catholic doctrine that only the pope can appoint bishops of the Church. Bishops in the CPA were government-appointed, a frequent aggravating factor in Sino-Vatican relations.

Some, including Hong Kong Cardinal Joseph Zen, saw the progress between Vietnam and Vatican officials towards re-establishing full diplomacy as a model for Sino-Vatican normalization of relations. By late 2004, prior to the death of Pope John Paul II, Vatican and Chinese government representatives were in contact with the apparent goal of moving closer to the normalization of relations. In late 2004, John Paul II received a "quasi-official" Chinese delegation in the Vatican. These overtures continued after the installation of Benedict XVI as Pope.

The Holy See and the Chinese government have long attempted to reach an agreement or workable compromise to maintain their influence over bishop appointments in China. In Pope Benedict XVI's May 27, 2007 letter to the bishops, priests, consecrated persons, and lay faithful of the Catholic Church in the People's Republic of China, he expressed that bishop appointments are "one of the most delicate problems in relations between the Holy See and the [Chinese] authorities." The Holy See understood that state authorities were attentive to bishop appointments because of the social impact church leadership has on the activities of the local Catholic communities. Pope Benedict XVI affirmed that the apostolic mandate on bishop appointments is strictly religious in nature; it is not meant to challenge the political authority of the government by addressing the state's internal affairs.

Despite the Vatican's continuous appeals for China to grant total freedom to the Holy See when exercising its spiritual authority on appointing bishops, China maintained its tight control on leading and monitoring the Catholic Church in China because it believes that "religion is closely linked with the comity between different ethnic groups, social stability, national security and reunification, as well as China's relations with foreign countries." For the Chinese government, internal religious affairs are matters of sovereignty. In a public address on December 13, 2001, CCP general secretary Jiang Zemin stressed the importance of regulating religion because of the influence it has on the political and social landscapes of a society. He stated that religion is a basic right that is to be enjoyed by all citizens, but activities should be within the scope of the Constitution and laws.

Provisional Agreement between the Holy See and the People's Republic of China 

On September 22, 2018, the Holy See and the People's Republic of China signed a two-year "Provisional Agreement between the Holy See and the People's Republic of China on the appointment of Bishops", set to expire on October 22, 2020. According to the communiqué released by the Holy See Press Office, the Provisional Agreement aimed to create "conditions for great collaboration at the bilateral level." This was the first time that an agreement of cooperation has been jointly signed by the Holy See and China. The exact terms of the Provisional Agreement have not been publicly released but people who are familiar with the agreement stated that it allowed for the Holy See to review bishop candidates recommended by the government-sanctioned Catholic Patriotic Association (CPA) prior to appointment and consecration. The Provisional Agreement granted veto power to the Holy See when reviewing the bishop nominees that the CPA has put forward. H.E. Mgr. Antonio Yao Shun, bishop of Jining, was the first bishop appointed under the framework of the Provisional Agreement. Pope Francis readmitted seven bishops appointed by the government without Pontifical mandate to full ecclesial communion in addition to the new appointments. In a communiqué released by the Holy See on October 22, 2020, the Holy See and China entered into a note verbale agreement to extend the Provisional Agreement for an additional two years, remaining in effect until October 22, 2022.

While the agreement is viewed by the Holy See as an opportunity to increase their presence in China, many thought that it diminished the Holy See's authority over the local church because it shared decision making powers with an authoritarian government. Cardinal Joseph Zen, former archbishop of Hong Kong, strongly opposed the deal, stating that the agreement is an incredible betrayal of the Catholics in China. As a response to the criticism, Pope Francis wrote a message to the Catholics of China and to the Universal Church on September 26, 2018 to provide context on how to view the Provisional Agreement. Pope Francis recognized that the Provisional Agreement is experimental in nature and will not resolve other conflicts between the Holy See and China, but it will allow for both parties to "act more positively for the orderly and harmonious growth of the Catholic community in China." China, on its part, also positively views the agreement, stating that it is willing to "further enhance understanding with the Vatican side and accumulate mutual trust, so that the momentum of active interaction between the two sides will continue to move forward." Despite strong opposition from the White House and conservative Catholics, the Holy See and China extended the Provisional Agreement.

In November 2020, a month after the Provisional Agreement was extended, China released the revised "Administrative Measures for Religious Clergy." The enforcement of the new rules will take effect on May 1, 2021. The Administrative Measures prioritize the Sinicization of all religion. Religious professionals are obligated to carry out their duties within the scope provided by the laws, regulations and rules of the government. The new rules do not consider the collaborative process set in place by the Provisional Agreement between the Holy See and China when appointing bishops. In Article XVI of the Administrative Measures, Catholic bishops are to be approved and consecrated by the government-sanctioned Chinese Catholic Bishops Conference. The document does not state that collaboration and approval from the Holy See to appoint bishops is required, going against the terms of the Provisional Agreement. Just a month before the release of the new rules, Foreign Ministry Spokesperson Zhao Lijian had stated that China is willing to work together with the Vatican "to maintain close communication and consultation and advance the improvement of bilateral ties" through the Provisional Agreement. Appointment of bishops without the consent of the Holy See violates the Catholic Church Canon Law 377.5, which states that "no rights and privileges of election, nomination, presentation, or designation of bishops are granted to civil authorities."

In July 2022, Pope Francis stated that he hoped the Provisional Agreement would be renewed, describing the agreement as "moving well." As of July 2022, six new bishops had been appointed under the agreement.

See also 

 Boxers and Saints, American graphic novel featuring Chinese Catholics in the Boxer Rebellion era
 Chinese Orthodox Church
 Chinese Regional Bishops' Conference of Taiwan
 Christianity in China
 House church (China)
 Ignatius Kung Pin-mei, Cardinal Kung
 Cardinal Kung Foundation
 List of cathedrals in China
 List of Catholic dioceses in China
 List of Catholic missionaries to China
 Martyr Saints of China
 Protestantism in China
 Religion in China
 Catholic Church in Sichuan
 Catholic Church in Shaanxi
 Catholic Church in Taiwan
 Three Pillars of Chinese Catholicism

References

Citations

Sources 
Please see individual articles for specific works.
 General
 
 
 
 

 Catholic missions and local Christianity before 1950
 
 
 
 
 
 

 Post 1949
 
 
 
 
  in Uhalley, Wu, ed. (2001).

External links 
 The Catholic Church in China by GCatholic.org
 Beijing Northern Church – a Full Introduction to the Home of Beijing Diocese by ChinaReport.com
 Catholics and Civil Society in China: Roundtable before the Congressional-Executive Commission on China, One Hundred Eighth Congress, Second Session, 17 September 2004
 
 Religious Freedom in China by Cardinal Kung Foundation
 Pope Francis and the People's Republic of China

 
China